Bésame Mucho is a classic Mexican 1940's song in Spanish.

Music
Besame Mucho (album), a jazz album by Art Pepper
Besame Mucho (Agents album), a 1987 an album by Topi Sorsakoski
Bésame Mucho, a 1999 album by Ricardo Moyano
Bésame mucho, el musical, a 2005 Mexican musical

Film
Besame Mucho (film), a Brazilian film 1987
Bésame mucho, a 1945 Mexican film with Blanquita Amaro 
Bésame mucho (1996 film), a 1996 Colombian film with Amparo Grisales and Gustavo Rodríguez
Besame mucho, a 1999 Italian comedy film directed by Maurizio Ponzi
Besame Mucho, a 2000 Israeli film with Ryan Early and Eli Danker
Bésame Mucho Festival, a music festival taking place in Los Angeles, CA. December 3, 2022.